The World Cyber Games 2004 was held in San Francisco, California, United States from the October 6–10. It was the first ever World Cyber Games to be held outside of Korea.

Official games

PC games

 Counter-Strike: Condition Zero
 FIFA Football 2004
 Need for Speed: Underground
 StarCraft: Brood War
 Unreal Tournament 2004
 Warcraft III: The Frozen Throne

Xbox games
 Halo: Combat Evolved
 Project Gotham Racing 2

Results

References

External links
 WCG 2004 Overview

World Cyber Games events
2004 in esports
2004 in sports in California
2004 in American sports
International esports competitions hosted by the United States